The men's single sculls competition at the 2014 Asian Games in Chungju, South Korea was held from 21 September to 25 September at the Tangeum Lake International Rowing Center.

Schedule 
All times are Korea Standard Time (UTC+09:00)

Results 
Legend
DNS — Did not start

Heats 
 Qualification: 1 → Final A (FA), 2–4 → Repechage (R)

Heat 1

Heat 2

Repechage 
 Qualification: 1–4 → Final A (FA), 5–6 → Final B (FB)

Final

References

External links
 Official website

Rowing at the 2014 Asian Games